Bethlehem is a disused train station in Bethlehem, Pennsylvania. It was constructed by the Central Railroad of New Jersey (CNJ) in 1873. Passenger service to the station ended in 1967. A restaurant opened within the station in 1976, and the building has continued to serve that role through several changes in ownership. The station is located on the north side of the Lehigh River, near Monocacy Creek, east of Main Street and south of East Lehigh Street. Another disused station, Union Station, is located on the south side of the Lehigh River.

History 
Passenger service to Bethlehem over the Lehigh and Susquehanna Railroad (L&S) began in 1868. The CNJ leased the L&S in 1871 in order to better compete with the Lehigh Valley Railroad, whose tracks ran along the opposite side of the Lehigh River. The current three-story building opened in 1873. The Bethlehem chapter of the United States Junior Chamber of Commerce (the Jaycees) leased the second floor in 1962 and undertook a restoration of the structure. Passenger service ended on August 18, 1967. The CNJ's Harrisburg-Jersey City, New Jersey Queen of the Valley, and local service to Jersey City, New Jersey were the last trains out of the station.

The "Lehigh Street Depot" restaurant, later known as the "Main Street Depot", opened on the first floor in 1976. Conrail, successor to the CNJ, formally sold the property to the restaurant owners in 1982. The Main Street Depot closed in 2010; a new restaurant, "The Wooden Match", opened in 2011.

References

External links 

 The Wooden Match

Former Central Railroad of New Jersey stations
Bethlehem, Pennsylvania
Railway stations in the United States opened in 1873
Railway stations closed in 1967
Former railway stations in Pennsylvania